This is a list of colleges, seminaries, and universities that do not have educational accreditation. In many countries, accreditation is defined as a governmental designation.

Degrees or other qualifications from unaccredited institutions may not be accepted by civil service or other employers. Some unaccredited institutions have formal legal authorization to enroll students or issue degrees, but in some jurisdictions (notably including the United States) legal authorization to operate is not the same as educational accreditation.

Institutions that appear on this list are those that have granted post-secondary academic degrees or advertised the granting of such degrees, but which are listed as unaccredited by a reliable source. An institution may not maintain accreditation for one of several reasons. A new institution may not yet have attained accreditation, while a long-established institution may have lost accreditation due to financial difficulties or other factors. Some unaccredited institutions are fraudulent diploma mills. Other institutions (for example, some Bible colleges and seminaries) choose not to participate in the accreditation process because they view it as an infringement of their religious, academic, or political freedom. Some government jurisdictions exempt religious institutions from accreditation or other forms of government oversight. Still other institutions are not required to have accreditation.

Some of the institutions on this list are no longer in operation. Several unaccredited universities have names that are similar to those of accredited institutions, and thus some persons may be misled into thinking that an entity is an accredited university. Accreditation is date-related: In the United States, colleges and universities are typically not fully accredited until several years after they open. Also, in the United States, many colleges and universities existed prior to the development of the modern accreditation system.

There are many organizations which give their own accreditation, not generally recognised as valid by governments and others, to educational institutions. Many of these are listed in the article List of unrecognized higher education accreditation organizations. Some of the educational institutions listed here claim accreditation from such organizations.

A 
 Accademia di Belle Arti di Medicino, Italy
 Académie Européene d'Informatisation, a.k.a. World Information Distributed University – WID, Belgium, Russia
 Academy of Natural Therapies, formerly in Hawaii until closed by court order; may have reopened in Wyoming, Colorado or Montana
 Academy of Religious & Spiritual Studies
 Adam Smith University, Liberia; Saipan
 Adams and Washington University, King College of Professional Studies, England
 Adams College
 Addison State University, Ottawa, Canada; "has no Ontario authorization to issue degrees"
 Adison University
 Advanced Learning Network, Vermont
 African Distributed University (AIDP), connected to World Information Distributed University
 Akamai University, Hawaii Not accredited by an agency recognized by the US DOE
 Alberdeen University, New Mexico
 Albert University, Delaware
 Al-Hurra University (or Alhuraa University), Sweden, Netherlands; US states of Michigan and Rhode Island
 Al-Ishraq University, Saudi Arabia
 Al Qasim University, Pakistan
 Al-Shurook University, Saudi Arabia
 Alexandria University (online), Nevada (not to be confused with Alexandria University in Egypt)
 All-American University, Nevada
 Alliance International University, Zambia
 All Saints American University, Liberia
 Allen Maxwell University, Wyoming
 Almeda University (also called Almeda College or Almeda International University)
 Ambai University, Massachusetts
 Ambassador University Corporation
 American Andragogy University, Hawaii, Bolivia
 American Capital University, Liberia
 American Central University, Wyoming
 American Century University, New Mexico; formerly known as Century University
 American City University
 American Coastline University, formerly operated from mailbox rental services in Hawaii and Louisiana and was owned by Dr. Richard Hoyer; also reported in Russia and the US states of California and New York
 American College of Brazilian Studies (AMBRA) Florida
 American College of Metaphysical Theology, Golden Valley, Minnesota
 American Columbus University, California
 American Global International University, Florida
 American Global University, Wyoming
 American Global University School of Medicine, Ohio
 American Independent International University
 American International University; one or more entities by this name are based in Oregon, California, and Lebanon (not to be confused with American InterContinental University)
 American International University of Management and Technology, Hawaii
 American Liberty University, US states of Alabama and California, also England, Greece, South Korea, China, Taiwan, Malaysia, and United Arab Emirates
 American National University, not to be confused with the accredited American National University, formerly known as National Business College
 American Pacific University, Vietnam and other Asian locations; has falsely claimed affiliation with Central Washington University
 American Pacwest International University
 American Scandinavian University, Sweden and US states of Texas and Arizona
 American School of Metaphysics, New York
 American State University (a.k.a. Hamilton University and Richardson University), Hawaii, Wyoming, and Caribbean
 American University for Humanities, formerly American University of Hawaii; US state of Mississippi and nations of India, Lebanon, and Georgia
 American University in London
 American University of Hawaii Gulfport, Mississippi; Clinton, Mississippi; (also reported to be operating in India; not to be confused with the University of Hawaii)
 American University of Human Services, Mississippi, reported closed as of 2007
 American University of London
 American University of Mayonic Science and Technology
 American University of Sovereign Nations, allegedly Japan, Thailand, USA and the Philippines; from its own website: "AUSN is not regionally or nationally accredited in the United States by traditional accreditation agencies" (affiliated with Accredited Universities of Sovereign Nations)
 American World University
 Americana University, Liberia, run by the Saint Regis University diploma mill
 Americus University, Washington, DC
 Ames Christian University, Florida
 Amstead University, United States
 Anacrusis Institute, Greece and United Kingdom
 Andersen University, California (not to be confused with institutions named Anderson University)
 Andersonville Theological Seminary (formerly Andersonville Baptist Seminary), Camilla, Georgia; ATS website states that it is accredited by Transworld Accrediting Commission, "on the list of Association of Christian Schools International (ACSI) Recognized College Programs", and by the National Accrediting Agency of Private Theological Institutions; none of these organizations are listed as a recognized accreditation agencies in the United States
 Anglo-American University, Hawaii
 Apostolic Prophetic Bible College & Theological Seminary, Rochester Hills, Michigan
 Apostolic Theological Bible College, Tampa, Florida
 Arabic Open University, Denmark
 Armstrong University (:zh:哈姆斯頓大學), Berkeley, California
Ashbourne University, England
 Ashford University (Great Britain), United Kingdom; not to be confused with the accredited Ashford University in Iowa
 Ashington University, British Virgin Islands, Louisiana
 Ashwood University, Florida, Pakistan, and possibly Texas; may operate "Universidad de las Palmas"
 Aston University, Nigeria (relationship with Aston University in the UK is not clear)
 Ateneo di Studi Superiori pro Pace, Italy, Belgium. Operated 1978–1988
 Atlanta University, Nigeria (not be confused with University of Atlanta, Clark Atlanta University or the Atlanta University Center)
 Atlantic International University, Hawaii (not to be confused with Atlantic University, Virginia)
 Atlantic Pacific University, Chengdu, China
 Auberdeen University, Idaho
 Auream Phoenix University, Dominica and Italy, run by the UNISELINUS diploma mill.

B 
 Badaganvi Sarkar World Open University Education Society, Gokak, Belgaum, Karnataka, India
 Barber-Scotia College, North Carolina, United States (lost accreditation in 2004)
 Barrington University, Mobile, Alabama (formerly operated by Virtual Academics. Com of Boca Raton, Florida)
 Bastyr University, Washington 
Bay Ridge Christian College (a.k.a. Bay Ridge College) in Texas. (The school states "we are non-accredited")
 Belford University (operated from a PO Box in Humble, Texas). Not connected with the also unaccredited University of Bedford, linked to University Degree Program, or the legitimate University of Bedfordshire.
 Beloved Community Seminary, Oregon, Hawaii
 Bennington University (not to be confused with Bennington College)
 Berean Bible College, Poway, California; claims approval from Accrediting Commission International, which is not recognized as an accreditor
 Berne University, Pennsylvania, Virginia, St. Kitts (not to be confused with University of Bern)
 Bernelli University, Virginia (United States), Italy; new name for Berne University
 Bethlehem Christian University, Culpeper, Virginia, a member of Life Christian University
 Bettis Christian University, Arkansas
 The Bible Doctrine Institute, Jacksonville, Florida; founded in 1986 as The Blue Ridge Bible Institute
 Bienville University Woodville, Mississippi; reported closed as of 2007
 Bircham International University (formerly Oxford International University)
 Blacksmith University, Nigeria
 Brainwells University, United States and Canada, but might be based elsewhere
 Brazilian Law International College (Blic)
 Brethren Bible Institute, Pathanamthitta, India
 Breyer State University
 Bridgewater University (associated with instantdegrees.com; not to be confused with Bridgewater College or Bridgewater State University)
Bridgewood University
 Britain College of Management and Science
 British West Indies Medical College (earlier known as West Indies College of Naturopathic Medicine and Surgery)
 Brixton University, British Columbia
 Brookside University, Barbados
 Bronte International University
 Burnell College, United Kingdom
 Burnett International University, Haiti, St. Kitts
 Buxton University (not to be confused with the University of Derby's Buxton campus) (connected with instantdegrees.com)

C 
Calamus International University (including Calamus Extension College and Vocalist International Distance Learning Academy), Vanuatu (formerly based in Turks and Caicos)
California University of Business and Technology, no claim of accreditation, only state approval
California Pacific School of Theology, Glendale, California; claims "accreditation" from the Association of Christian Colleges and Theological Schools, but this is not a recognized higher education accreditor in the United States
California South University, Irvine, California. Address is a single family home. It is a degree mill.
Calvary Baptist Bible College, King, North Carolina
 Calvary Chapel Bible College, Murrieta, California (This institution's website states: "We are not accredited, nor are we seeking accreditation, so as to be free from outside control and remain open to the leading of the Holy Spirit.")
Cal Southern University, Houston, Texas, and registered in the South Pacific island of Niue (not to be confused with the University of Southern California in Los Angeles, California, California Southern University in Irvine, California, or California Southern Law School in Riverside, California)
 California Takshila University, San Jose, California
 Calvary University, Virginia (US); not to be confused with the accredited Calvary University in Kansas City, Missouri, formerly known as Calvary Bible College. Also reported in Oregon, UK, Netherlands, and other countries
 Cambridge Graduate University
Cambridge International University, Cape Town, South Africa; Arizona, US
 Cambridge State University, Jackson, Mississippi ("district officials discovered the school has an extensive criminal history and is nothing more than a diploma mill.")
Canadian School of Management
Canbourne University (not to be confused with Camborne School of Mines)
Canby Bible College] Canby, Oregon, formerly Leadership Training Institute (Oregon's Office of Degree Authorization lists this institution as "unaccredited religious exempt school")
 Canterbury University, Seychelles
 Canyon College
 Capital City Religious Institute, Baton Rouge, Louisiana
 Capitol University
 Carlingford University, scam run by a prison inmate in Wisconsin; shut down in 2010; the name used to be identified with an address in London, and with the University Degree Program
 Carlton College, Hong Kong; offer online bachelor and master courses.
 Carolina International University, North Charleston, South Carolina
 Carolina University of Theology, Manassas, Virginia; website states that school is accredited by Accrediting Commission International, but notes "This accreditation is not recognized by the US Dept. of Education. It is our intention in the months ahead to pursue a full accredited status with an agency recognized by the US Dept. of Education ... a lengthy process") This note was on the CUT FAQ in 2006, and remained unchanged in March 2017.
 Centro di Tecnologia Universitaria Straniera – CE.T.U.S, Italy
 Chadwick University, Alabama
 Charis Bible College, Colorado Springs, Colorado
 Charis School of Divinity, Florida
 Chase University
 Chesapeake Baptist College, Severn, Maryland; claims approval from Accrediting Commission International, which is not recognized as an accreditor
 Christ Alive Christian Seminary and University, Nigeria
 Christ For The Nations Institute
 Christian Bible College, Rocky Mount, North Carolina
 Christian Leadership University, New York
 Christians of Charity American University of Sci. and Tech., Nigeria
 Clarksville School of Theology, Clarksville, Tennessee; shut down in 1982
 Clayton College of Natural Health (same operator as Chadwick University) (in Alabama)
 Clayton Theological Institute, California
 ClosedCollegeDiploma.com
 Clayton University, Hong Kong, China, San Marino, Nigeria, India
 Colonial Academy, Chicago
 Colton University
 Columbia Pacific University
 Columbia State University
 Columbus University, Picayune, Mississippi (Closed by state action in Louisiana)
 Collumbus University, UK or Nigeria
 Commonwealth Open University (Virgin Islands; not to be confused with Commonwealth Institute)
 Communion of Saints Seminary, Oregon
 Concordia College and University Dominica, US
 Concordia Theologica Institute For Biblical Studies
 The Constantinian University, Rhode Island. Also known as Università costantiniana (in Italian).
 Corlins University (spelled Corllins University on its website). In 2017, receipt of a Corllins University degree was used to support an application for a position as a high school principal in Pittsburg, Kansas. While the application was successful, students preparing a profile of their new principal for the school's student newspaper discovered that Corllins was not accredited, and the newly-hired principal subsequently resigned.
 Cranmer Theological House, Louisiana; Texas
 Crescent City Christian College, Metairie, Louisiana, ("basically a coach's house—no campus, no facilities, no faculty, no library that anyone could discover")
 Crown College, Tacoma, Washington, (lost accreditation in 2007)
 Cumbres de Chile University (Universidad Cumbres de Chile), Viña del Mar, Chile

D 
 Delta International University of New Orleans, not accredited by an agency recognized by the US DOE
 Dispensational Theological Seminary Forest Grove, Oregon (Oregon's Office of Degree Authorization lists this institution as an unaccredited religious exempt school)
Dnyaneshwar Vidyapeeth, India
 Donsbach University (Donsbaugh, Donsback University)
 Dorcas University, Honolulu, Hawaii
 Dublin Metropolitan University

E 
 Earlscroft University UK, Ireland, Seychelles
 Earlstown University (associated with UDP International)
 Earthnet Institute, Hawaii
 Eastern Caribbean University, Texas; St. Kitts, Virgin Islands
 East Point University
 Ecole Supérieure Robert de Sorbon, France; also linked to the American Universities Admission Program in Sarasota, Florida, which was sued in 2006 for allegedly using the logo of the American Association of College Registrars and Admissions Officers to deceive prospective students (The school on its website disputes the allegation of being a diploma mill.)
 Edenvale University, Dallas, Texas
 Edison University
 Ellington University
 Emmaus Baptist College, Brandon, Florida
 Eurasia Community College, Italy
 European American University, Dominica
 European Carolus Magnus University, Belgium and possibly other locations in Europe
 European Continental University, United Kingdom, Delaware
 European Institute of Technology, Italy, San Marino; unconnected with European Institute of Innovation and Technology
 European Management University International, Denmark; also Sweden, US and China
 European Open University, not to be confused with the European Open Universities Network at European Association of Distance Teaching Universities
 European Union University, Madrid, Spain (but incorporated in the US state of Iowa)
 European University of Ireland

F 
 Fairfax University
 Faith School of Theology, says it is accredited by IASBC (which is actually SAABC); SAABC is a fraud
 Faith Seminary – Salem, formerly Oregon Theological Seminary (Oregon's Office of Degree Authorization lists this institution as unaccredited religious exempt school)
 Farington University
 Florida State Christian College, Florida
 Frederick Taylor University, California
 Frederick Taylor International University, Hawaii; California. Former branch of Frederick Taylor University 
 Freedom Bible College and Seminary, Siloam Springs, Arkansas; claims accreditation from the International Commission on Academic Accreditation, which it notes "is not recognized by the United States Department of Education. Credits earned at any ICAAI accredited institution are not automatically transferable."
 Free Gospel Bible Institute, an independent Pentecostal Bible college in Export, PA
 Freie und Private Universität Herisa, Switzerland
 Friends International Christian University, Florida; California. Website states, "FICU is not accredited by an accrediting agency recognized by the US Secretary of education."
 Frontier Christian University, Indiana (formerly Southern Indiana Bible College)
 Full Gospel Christian College, Pontiac, Michigan

G 
 Gandhi Hindi Vidyapith
 Generale University (also called Generale Polytechnic Institute)
 Geo-Metaphysical Institute, New York
 George Wythe University, Cedar City, Utah
 Georgian International University, Paoli, Pennsylvania
 Glencullen University, "A phony 'Irish university' is marketing degrees internationally via the Internet. An EL reporter in the US, posing as a prospective student, has been offered an English literature degree from 'Glencullen University', without any study, for $960."
 Glendale University (previously called Glenndale University)
 Glenford University in Mississippi, reported closed as of 2007
 Global Center for Advanced Studies
 Global Church Theological Seminary and Global Church University
 Golden State Baptist College, Santa Clara, California; part of Independent Baptist Bible College Movement, listed in Wikipedia category "unaccredited Christian colleges and universities"
 Golden State School of Theology (Stockton, California)
 Golden State University (a.k.a. Honolulu University of the Arts, Sciences and Humanities), US, Lebanon
 Greenwich University, operated on Norfolk Island from 1998 to 2002; unconnected with University of Greenwich, London, England

H 
 Hamilton University (a.k.a. American State University and Richardson University)
 Hartford University (not to be confused with University of Hartford), this name has been used by the University Degree Program, an entity apparently based in Vanuatu and falsely claiming a location in Minnesota, and an entity in Washington, DC
 Headway University, probably Pakistan
 Heartland Baptist Bible College, Oklahoma City, Oklahoma; the school's website states that they "seek no national or regional accreditation, but seeks only God's approval"
 Hill University
 Holy Trinity College and Seminary, New Port Richey, Florida; seminary's website notes its choice to remain unaccredited and states, "the degree programs of this college are designed solely for religious vocations."
 Honolulu University (a.k.a. Honolulu University of the Arts, Sciences, and Humanities and Golden State University)
Houdegbe North American University Benin
 Hubbard College of Administration International, Los Angeles, California
Huntington Pacific University
 Hyles-Anderson College and Hyles-Anderson College Seminary, Crown Point, Indiana; part of Independent Baptist Bible College Movement; founder asserted that the college remains unaccredited because the government would "take away our freedom"

I 
 Innovation University of Silicon Valley IUSV claims to be located in California
 Illinois Theological Seminary Online, also named In-Depth Theological Seminary, Independent Theological Seminary and Intercontinental Theological Seminary; the school states: "ITS is not an accredited school with any accreditation board. ITS very much cherishes... the principle of separation between Church and State."
Indian Institute of Alternative Medicine, Kolkata, India
Indian Institute of Alternative Medicine and Research, Kolkata, India
 Indian Institute of Planning and Management, an unaccredited business school based out of India
 Indian Institute of Science and Engineering, New Delhi, India
 Indian Management School and Research Centre, Maharashtra, India 
 Indiana Christian University ("Indiana Christian University is approved by the Indiana State Approving Agency for training of veterans and other eligible persons"
 Institute for Creation Research Graduate School and School of Biblical Apologetics, Dallas, Texas)
 Instituto Latinoamericano de Psicobiofisica, Italy
 Intercontinental University
 Intercultural Open University Foundation, global, has had headquarters in the Netherlands, Spain and the US
 Interfaith Seminary, formerly Interfaith School of Theology, New Rochelle, New York
 International American University, California; Nepal
 International Bible University, Norwalk, California; Carpinteria, California; Hawaii. Also called "E M International Bible University" or "E.M.I. Bible University."
 International Institute of Technology, or Institut International Technologie (IIT), Tunisia. It claims to be accredited by a German agency (asiin.de) (not recognized by the Tunisian Government) without providing any evidence
 International Management Centres Association (IMCA or IMC Association), Buckingham, UK
 International Open University (aka Standford University), US, (not to be confused with International Open University, The Gambia).
International peace University, Germany
 International Seminary, Plymouth, Florida; claims accreditation only from Accrediting Commission International; Alan Contreras, of Oregon's Office of Degree Authorization, described all schools accredited by ACI as "fake or substandard"
 International Theological University, California
 The International University, Italy
 The International University, Missouri or Nigeria
 International University of Ministry and Education, Grandview, Missouri
 International University, Vienna, an American unaccredited private institution with a campus in Vienna, Austria
 IOND University, Hawaii; Japan
 Irish International University
 Isles International University
 ISSEA SA, Switzerland and San Marino, operates and operated a series of diploma mills
 Ivory Carlson University, lacks approval to operate in Minnesota, may be based in India

J 
 James Monroe University (also called James Monroe International University)
 Jacksonville Theological Seminary, Southaven, Mississippi
 Jackson Hole Bible College, Jackson Hole, Wyoming (Offers a one year "Diploma of Biblical Foundations," not degrees)
 Johnson Daves University (or Johnson Davids University), Liberia, British Virgin Islands, United States

K 
 Kennedy-Western University
 Kensington University, California; Hawaii; closed in 2003 by state action
 Kent College, Louisiana (not to be confused with Kent College, an independent day and boarding school in the UK)
 Kentucky Christian University, Ashland, Kentucky (not to be confused with Kentucky Christian University in Grayson, Kentucky, which is accredited)
 Kepler College, Washington (state)
 Kingdom Truth University, Jacksonville, Florida; says it is accredited by "TRANSWORD", which is not a recognized accreditor
 Kingston College, British Columbia; illegal operation closed down October 4, 2006; not to be confused with Kingston College in Kingston upon Thames, Surrey, England
 Kingston University
 Kingston University (Los Angeles)
 Kingsway Bible University (Des Moines, Iowa) (formerly Mid-States Bible College; claims accreditation from International Association of Bible Colleges and Seminaries, which is not a recognized accreditor
 Knightsbridge University
 Knoxville College (lost accreditation in 1996)

L 
 Lacrosse University, reported closed as of 2007
 Lambuth University, Jackson, Tennessee; lost accreditation in 2010)
 Landford University
 Lansbridge University
 LaSalle University, Louisiana (a diploma mill not associated with legitimate Lasallian educational institutions)
 Leadway University, Nigeria
 Leibniz Campus – Libera Università Internazionale G. W. Leibni, Italy
 Libera Università degli Studi di Formel, Italy
 Libera Universitas Multidisciplinare Umanitaria perla Cultura Internazionale – LUMUC, Italy
 Life Christian University, Tampa, Florida
 LinkCamPus, Zug, Switzerland, (not to be confused with Link Campus University; formerly Unisanraffaele unise.ch)
 Lincoln University, Louisiana, USA
 Lobi Business School, Nigeria
 Logos University International / Logos International University (UniLogos), Miami, USA
 London College of Technology and Business
 London External Studies, UK or Nigeria
 Lorenz University
 Los Angeles University
 Louisiana Baptist University (formerly Baptist Christian University)
 Louisiana Christian University, Lake Charles, Louisiana

M 
 Madison University, Gulfport, Mississippi
 Maharana Patap Shiksha Niketan Vishwavidyalaya, Pratapgarh, India
Mahila Gram Vidyapith, Prayag, Allahabad, India
 Maithili University/Vishwavidyalaya, Darbhanga, Bihar, India
 Management Institute of Canada
 Marquis Open University, Italy
 Master's International School of Divinity, Evansville, Indiana (Oregon's Office of Degree Authorization lists this institution as "unaccredited religious exempt school")
 McFord University, probably Pakistan
 Metropolitan Collegiate Institute (associated with the fake teaching hospital Sussex General Hospital, both purportedly in London)
 Metro University, Nigeria
 Miami Christian University, Miami, Florida
 Mid-States Bible College (Des Moines, Iowa) (now Kingsway Bible University)
 Midtown University, Florida or Panama
 Miranda International University, Italy
 Mississippi International University
 Monticello University
 Mountain States Baptist College, Montana; part of Independent Baptist Bible College Movement
MUST University, California; not to be confused with Macau University of Science and Technology, Malaysia University of Science and Technology, Mindanao University of Science and Technology (Philippines), Minghsin University of Science and Technology (Taiwan), Misr University for Science & Technology (Egypt), or other schools with similar names that include "University of Science and Technology"

N 
 National University of Nigeria
 National University of Medical Sciences
National University of Electro Complex Homeopathy, Uttar Pradesh, India
 New Age International University, nominally of the Principality of Seborga, a micronation within the borders of Italy; admissions, licensing and certification are controlled by the Institute of Education, Research & Development, Kolkata, India. As of 2012, degrees and doctorates were available for the same fee of Rs 48,550.
 New England State University
 New Testament Christian Seminary, a Pentecostal Bible institute in Graham, WA
Newburgh Theological Seminary, Newburgh, Indiana, USA
 Newton University, Vancouver, Canada; Hawaii, USA (closed by court order)
 New Tribes Bible Institute, Jackson, Michigan; Waukesha, Wisconsin
 New West Seminary Oregon City, Oregon; Oregon's Office of Degree Authorization lists this institution as an unaccredited religious exempt school
 Nightingale University, Panama City, Panama; Melbourne, Australia
 Nobel University, South Korea
 Non Traditional University of USA (a.k.a. University of USA), Italy
 North American Reformed Seminary, Flagstaff, Arizona
 North Central University, Nigeria
 Northfield University
 North Lexington University, Massachusetts
 North Norway University, Norway, Panama, UK
 Northwestern International University, Ltd., Cyprus, Denmark (not to be confused with other schools named Northwestern University)
Norway University or University of Norway, Panama or the UK
 Novus University or Novus University International, Diamondhead, Mississippi
Novus University School of Law (a.k.a. Novus University Law School) registered in Marshall Islands, but run in Palmdale, California by Natalie Handy, spouse of James Kirk.

O 
 Oaklands University, United Kingdom; may be "a new version of the University Degree Program"
 Open International University, Nigeria
 Open International University for Complementary Medicines, Sri Lanka 
 Oregon College of Ministry, Gresham, Oregon; Oregon's Office of Degree Authorization lists this institution as an unaccredited religious exempt school
 Oval Bible College, Lake Charles, Louisiana; claims accreditation from American Accrediting Association of Theological Institutions, which is unrecognized
 Ozark Bible Institute, a Pentecostal Bible college in Neosho, MO, loosely connected with the Assemblies of God

P 
 Pacific International University, Springfield, Missouri; originally was located in Victoria, Australia
 Pacific National University and Theological Institute, Los Angeles, California
 Pacific Southern University
 Panworld University, probably Pakistan
 Patriot Bible University (formerly Patriot University, Colorado), claims that its accreditation is by American Accrediting Association of Theological Institutions, which is an unrecognized agency deemed to be an accreditation mill
 Pebble Hills University, Italy; a police fraud investigation revealed that the university's "headquarters" in Seborga, Italy is a room in a building used as a cellar, also the home of ten other diploma mills: Saint Bernard University, Eurasia Community College, Instituto Latinoamericano de Psicobiofisica – I.L.A.P.; St. Paul Ottawa College & University, Phoenix International University Europe, West Coast University – WCU; The International University; Miranda International University; Marquis Open University; and James Monroe International University
 Pebbles University, Nigeria
 Penbrook University
 Pensacola Bible Institute
 Phoenix International University Europe
 Politecnico degli Studi Internazionali, Switzerland. Closed when the owner was arrested.
 Portland Bible College Portland, Oregon (Oregon's Office of Degree Authorization lists this institution as unaccredited religious exempt school)
 Preston University (a.k.a. Fairmount International University)
 Preston University Pakistan
 Pro Deo State University, New York. Also known as "Universitas Internationalis Studiorum Superiorum Pro Deo" and "Patriarchal Studium Generale Universitas Pro-Deo".
 Promis University of London

Q 
 Queenston University, Utah, Vanuatu, and Australia

R 
 Raja Arabic University, Nagpur, India
 Ralston College
 Randford University
 Redding University
 Regent International University (not to be confused with the accredited Regent University in Virginia Beach, Virginia)
 Revans University, Vanuata
 Rev. D. O. Ockiya College of Theology and Management Sciences, Nigeria (lack of accreditation affects only its degree-awarding programmes)
 Richmond Open University, Nigeria
 Ridgewood University
 Rochville University (not to be confused with University of La Rochelle, an accredited university in France)
 Rocklands University
 Royal University Izhia, Nigeria
 Rushmore University
 Rutherford University (previously known as Senior University and Stratford International University)

S 
 Sacramento International University (also called San Francisco International University, and Bellington University)
 Saint Augustines University of Technology, Nigeria
 Saint Bernard University, Italy
Sherwood University, United Kingdom
 St. Christopher Iba Mar Diop – College of Medicine, UK, US
 St. Clements University, called a "degree mill" by the State of Maine, but removed from list after a formal action taken by St. Clements University
 St. John's University School of Medicine, Montserrat
 St. John's University or St. John's University of Practical Theology, Springfield, Louisiana
 Saint Luke School of Medicine, Liberia; California; Ghana
 Saint Martin's College and Seminary, Milwaukee, Wisconsin.
 St. Paul's College & Seminary, Saint Paul, Minnesota
 St. Paul Ottawa College & University, Italy
 St. Regis University, Dominica; Liberia; Washington D.C.; and Washington (closed by court order in June 2005), (not to be confused with Regis University in Denver, which is accredited)
 Saint Stephen's Educational Bible College, Los Angeles, California
 Saint Theresa's Medical University, St. Kitts
 St. Thomas-a-Becket College & University, Canterbury, England
 Saint Wolbodo Seminary, Baltimore, Maryland
 Samuel Ahmadu University, Nigeria
 Sancta Sophia Seminary, Oklahoma; claims "accreditation" by the Accrediting Commission International for Schools, Colleges, and Theological Seminaries, Inc., an unrecognized accreditation agency
 Sequoia University, Los Angeles and Oklahoma; closed by court order in 1984
 Sheffield State University, location unknown, accredited by ACICU, a known accreditation mill, not in US DoE database.
 Si Tanka University, Eagle Butte, South Dakota
 Silicon Valley University, San Jose, California.
 Somerset University
 Shalom Bible Institute (Describes itself as "We are also not accredited as we do not offer any type of degree programs, just certificates of completion.")
 South California Polytechnic University, Taiwan
 South Pacific University
 Southern Pacific University, Malaysia
 Springfield Christian College and Theological Seminary
 Standford University (a.k.a. International Open University), US
 Stanton University
 Strategic Business School, Nigeria
 Success Seminary, Oregon
 Suffield University; operating illegally in Connecticut
 Summit Theological Seminary, Peru, Indiana; its website says it "never has nor will seek accreditation"
 Summerset University, "Appears to be a new version of the "University Degree Program" cluster supposedly closed by UK and US action. It has no legal authority to issue degrees."
 Sunday Adokpela University, Nigeria
 Sutherland University

T 
 Tabernacle Baptist College, in Greenville, South Carolina ("the degrees awarded are neither certified by the State of Virginia nor are they accredited by any organization or regional agency")
 Taiken Wilmington University, Japan
 Tecana University, South America
 Templeton University, Singapore and Nevada
 Tennessee Bible College, Cookeville, Tennessee
 Tennessee Christian University, Tennessee
 Texas Christian Bible University, Crowley, Texas not to be confused with Texas Christian University
 Texas Theological University, Texas
 The University of America, California, Murrieta, California registered as a high school with the State of California
 Therapon University, Saint Thomas, US Virgin Islands (It claims accreditation from American Accrediting Association of Theological Institutions, which it describes as "not recognized by the U.S. Department of Education as one of the seven official regional accrediting agencies. This non-recognition may have some implications that include" that students may not be able to use "its degrees for employment.")
 Thomas Jefferson Education Foundation, South Dakota
 Thompson University
 Thornewood University, Great Britain
 Thornhill University, United Kingdom
 The Thornwood University, probably in the United Kingdom or the Netherlands
 Thunderwood College, Internet only, an admitted spoof website for an unaccredited college which offers instant "degrees" in a variety of subjects
 Tiu International University, UK and Nigeria
 Trafalgar Distance Learning Institute, Calgary and Red Deer, Alberta, Canada
 Trident University of Technology, United States, Singapore
 Trilogy Education Services, United States 
 Tri-Valley University, Pleasanton, California; raided by United States Immigration and Customs Enforcement (ICE) for allegedly operating as a front for illegal immigration
 Trinity College of the Bible and Theological Seminary, Newburgh, Indiana ("Trinity is currently working towards accreditation with a U.S. Department of Education (USDE) recognized agency for all of its programs.")
 Trinity College and University
 Trinity International University College, Wyoming, Delaware, France; not to be confused with Trinity International University
 Trinity Southern University (See: Colby Nolan)
 Trinity Southwest University, Albuquerque, New Mexico
 Trinity Valley Baptist Seminary and College, Kennedale, Texas; claims approval from Accrediting Commission International, which is not recognized as an accreditor
Trump University, New York
 Tyndale Theological Seminary, Texas; institution's website states "Tyndale Theological Seminary & Biblical Institute has no plans to pursue any type of accreditation." In 1999, Tyndale Theological Seminary was fined for violating a state law that required institutions to have state approval or accreditation to award degrees or use terms such as "college" or "university" in their names. The fine was appealed, and in August 2007 the Texas Supreme Court ruled that Tyndale and other seminaries that offer theological education and award religious degrees can do so without state government approval or accreditation.

U 
 UNESCO University, Nigeria
 Unisanraffaele unise.ch (not to be confused with Università telematica San Raffaele), Switzerland, closed and reopened as LinkCamPus
 United Christian University, Nigeria
United Nations University (India), Delhi, India (not to be confused with United Nations University)
 United Nigeria University Colleg]
 Universal Bible Institute, Birmingham, Alabama
 Universal Life Church Seminary
 Universal University
 Università Mons Calpe, Gibraltar
 Università Popolare degli Studi di Milano, also known as Università Popolare di Milano (not to be confused with the well-known Università degli Studi di Milano), Milan, Italy. Not recognized as a university by the Italian Ministry of Education. Same founder/owner (Marco Grappeggia) as the Yorker International University, also unaccredited.
 Università Popolare San Tommaso D'Aquino, Italy
 Universitas Internationalis Studiorum Superiorum "Pro Deo", United States
 Universitas Sancti Cyrilli, Malta
 Université Européenne Jean Monnet a.i.s.b.l
 Université de Wallis, lists addresses in Wallis and Futuna and United Kingdom
 University Consulting, Inc.
 University Degree Program (formerly operated at least 28 different diploma mills in at least five countries)
 University of Action Learning (UAL)
 University of Applied Sciences & Management, Benin and Nigeria
 University of Bedford (not to be confused with the legitimate UK University of Bedfordshire)
 University of Berkley, Erie County, Pennsylvania
 University of Beverly Hills, California
 University of Bums on Seats (satirical)
 University of Central Europe, Pascagoula, Mississippi. Reported closed as of 2007.
 University of Devon
 University of Ecoforum for Peace, Switzerland
 University of Esoterica (Institution website states: "We are not accredited by any state agency, and don't want to be...due to entanglements and Separation of Church and State.")
 University of the Holy Land, Israel
 University of Humberside (fake) (not to be confused with the University of Lincoln, which formerly used this name)
 University of Industry, Nigeria
 University of Lamberhurst
 University of Metaphysical Sciences, California and Minnesota
 University of Metaphysical Studies, New Mexico
 University of Metaphysics, Studio City, California, and Sedona, Arizona. Also called University of Sedona
 University of the Nations
 University of Natural Health, Brandon, Mississippi
 University of Natural Medicine, New Mexico (no claim or evidence of recognized accreditation for a US school)
 University of North America, Virginia
 University of Northern Virginia Closed by order of the State Council of Higher Education for Virginia.
 University of Northern Washington
 University of NorthWest
 University of Redwood (fictitious)
 University of Santa Monica, also known as Kohenor University
 University of Sedona, Studio City, California, and Sedona, Arizona. Alternative name for University of Metaphysics
 Uttar Pradesh Vishwavidyalaya, India
 United Buddhist Nations University, Conducting doctorate courses in Buddhism & Psychology with addresses in Japan, Vietnam, Argentina and not recognized in any of the countries

V 
 Valley University
 Vancouver University Worldwide
 Varanaseya Sanskrit Vishwavidyalaya
 Vision International University
 Volta University College, Ghana and Nigeria

W 
 Walesbridge University; California
 Walker University a.k.a. International Institute of Supplementary Education; Nevada. Website states: "[Doctorates] have not any academic or administrative value".
 Warnborough College; Ireland, United Kingdom, and Canyon, Texas
 WARP University, Fort Mill, South Carolina
 Warren National University
 Washington American Governors University, Delaware
 Washington College and University (not to be confused with authorized institutions using the name Washington; see )
 Washington International University, Pennsylvania, British Virgin Islands (not to be confused with authorized institutions using the name Washington; see )
 Washington School of Theology, Oregon
 Washington University (washingtonuniversity.us) (not to be confused with authorized institutions using the name Washington; see )
 Washington University of Barbados School of Medicine – closed in 2018 after arrest of CEO and director
 West Coast University, Italy
 West Coast University – Panama, Bangladesh
 Western Michigan Bible Institute, Muskegon, Michigan
 Western States University, (a.k.a. Western States University for Professional Studies) in Doniphan, MO. (Closed in 2005 while under review by the Missouri Department of Higher Education)
Western Advanced Central University – also known as WACU or Western Central College, they are associated with Ashford College and claim to be recognized by the ACOHE (Accreditation Council for Online Higher Education).
Westfield University, related to college-degree-fast.com, not to be confused with Westfield State University in Massachusetts
 Westmore College or Westmore University, Singapore
 Weston Reserve University, multiple locations, including Seychelles, Kuwait, Canada
Whitefield Theological Seminary
 Whitton University
 William Carey International University, Pasadena, CA
 Williamsburg University
 Winchester University (unaccredited) (not to be confused with University of Winchester)
 Wisconsin International University, Florida, Ghana (Wisconsin International University College has National Accreditation Board accreditation in Ghana as a university college affiliated with the University of Ghana and University of Cape Coast), Ukraine and other locations, now using the name Worldwide International University
 Woodfield University (also operates the illicit Woodfield High School), South Carolina
 Woolston-Steen Theological Seminary, Washington
 Worchester University, Panama
 World Information Distributed University, a.k.a. Academie Européenne d'Informatisation – AEI Russia; Belgium; Switzerland
World Records University, It claims to be based in the UK. However, in reality, it does not exist anywhere in the world let alone in the UK. It is a Diploma Mill solely operates from Faridabad, India.
 Worldwide International University, new name of Wisconsin International University

Y 
 York University, California (Claims accreditation from World Association of Universities and Colleges, which is not recognized by the US Department of Education.)
 Yorker International University (formerly New Yorker University), chiefly USA, Italy, and Argentina; unaccredited or accredited through accreditation mills.
 Youngsfield University, New York, United Kingdom
 YUIN/American University, Hawaii, California

Z 
 Zenith University, Hawaii; related to Pickering and Brighton Universities; not to be confused with Zenith University College in Ghana

See also 
 Accreditation mill
 American Biographical Institute
 Bogus colleges in the United Kingdom
 Council for Higher Education Accreditation
 Diploma mill
 Distance education
 Educational accreditation
 List of recognized accreditation associations of higher learning
 List of unrecognized higher education accreditation organizations
 List of unaccredited higher education institutions in Switzerland
 List of fictional British and Irish universities
 Nationally recognized accrediting agencies in the United States

References 

Unaccredited institutions